Búzios oil field is a large ultra-deepwater oil field located in the Santos Basin, about  off the coast of Rio de Janeiro, Brazil. Originally named Franco oil field, it was the second largest pre-salt find in the basin since 2007, behind Tupi oil field, which holds between  equivalent and is located just south of the Búzios oil field.

Etymology 
The field was named after Búzios, Rio de Janeiro.

History 
The field was discovered in May 2010 with an encounter of light oil which measured 30° API. The find was announced on May 14, 2010, however the Brazilian authorities claim the second well named Libra proved to be even larger than Búzios oil field. It was also announced that Franco was not linked to Iara field located near the discovery. Búzios was owned by ANP, who paid Petrobras a total of $150 million to drill the well.

Reservoir 

ANP official stated there was no gas discovered in the prospect, making the field more profitable and easier to develop.

See also 

 Campos Basin
 Iara oil field
 Libra oil field
 Tupi oil field

References 

Oil fields of Brazil
Santos Basin
Petrobras oil and gas fields